Ion Creangă Children's Park is a children's park in Timișoara that bears the name of Romanian children's author Ion Creangă.

Location 
The park is located between the Bega Canal, the Michelangelo overpass and bridge, the ensemble of historical buildings on Constantin Diaconovici Loga Boulevard and Martir Leontina Bânciu Street. The Children's Park has two main entrances, the first one on Michelangelo Boulevard, and the second one on the 1989 Romanian Revolution Boulevard.

History 
The development of the park began in 1858, in parallel with that of Coronini Park (present-day Queen Marie Park); the works were completed 33 years later, in 1891, and the new park was named Franz Joseph Park. The idea of this park started from the city council, which, around the preparation of the Agro-Industrial Exhibition in Southern Hungary (1891), saw an excellent possibility for the arrangement of the right bank of the Bega River. The park kept its original name until 1919, when it was renamed Mihai Eminescu Park. Later, after 1950, it was called Pioneers Park.

The Children's Park was closed to the public in 2004, when the Office of Consumer Protection found that the toys in the park were no longer safe for children. Later, following an investment of almost 2 million euros, the park was transformed and redeveloped. It was reopened in 2012 on Children's Day.

Flora 
Most of the current vegetation is represented by secular oaks, spruces, pines and other deciduous species. It is worth noting the presence of Gingko biloba specimens and softwood trees – willows, locusts, lindens, etc. Among the ornamental and decorative plants can be found: roses, lavenders, azaleas, hibiscus, daffodils, chrysanthemums, violets, begonias, sages, etc.

Gallery

References

Further reading 

 
 

Parks in Timișoara